Kadijević is a Serbian surname.

Notable people with the name include:

 Đorđe Kadijević (born 1933), Serbian and Yugoslav film director, screenwriter and art critic
 Luis Kadijevic (1947–2021), Argentine football player
 Veljko Kadijević (1925–2014), Serbian general of the Yugoslav People's Army

See also
 Kadija (disambiguation)

Serbian surnames